Freedom of speech (FoS), or freedom of expression (FoE), is the right to communicate one's opinions and ideas.

It may also refer to:

 Affirmation of Freedom of Speech and rejection of anti-blasphemy laws
 Defamation of religion, affirmation of Freedom of Speech, and UN
 Freedom from religion
 Freedom of religion
 Freedom of expression in India
 Section Two of the Canadian Charter of Rights and Freedoms#Freedom of expression
 Freedom of Expression (book), a book by Kembrew McLeod about freedom of speech issues

See also 

 Blasphemy
 Figure of speech
 Freedom of thought
 Freethought